Seoul Raiders is a 2005 Hong Kong action film co-written and directed by Jingle Ma and starring Tony Leung Chiu-wai, Richie Jen and Shu Qi. The film is a sequel to the 2000 film Tokyo Raiders.

Plot
Agent Lam teams up with JJ to track a pair of plates used to make counterfeit American dollars.

When the plates are captured and make their way to Korea, Lam gets on a plane and searches for the plates in Seoul, tracking a man who he believes to have stolen them. During the hunt, he comes across JJ, who happens be a thief with a hidden agenda. When JJ thinks she has successfully walked away with the plates, she does not realize Lam has preempted her by swapping it with an empty case.

Lam goes to the US Embassy with the plates to claim the $30 million reward offered but is outwitted by a staffer named Owen, who manages to drug him and flee to Korea with the plates.

Lam immediately follows Owen to Korea and meets up with a bevy of pretty Korean assistants. When Owen is about to trade the plates with "Black Bear", a top dog of the Korean underworld, Lam and his girls break in to thwart the deal, but Owen escapes with the plates in the nick of time.

Meanwhile, Lam bumps into JJ in Korea, and the pair decide to work together to take back the plates and split the reward. While Owen is immersing himself in a hot spring, Lam sneaks in and snatches the plates. He then uses the plates to lure Owen into his trap, arresting him in the end.  Only then does he realize that Owen is in fact a CIA undercover agent.

While Lam and Owen reconcile and decide to cooperate to bring down "Black Bear," JJ secretly retrieves the plates from Owen's hiding place but only ends up leading "Black Bear" to the plates and is kidnapped.

Lam and Owen has no alternative but to meet "Black Bear" in a deserted sports stadium to settle the deal once and for all.

Cast
 Tony Leung Chiu-wai as Agent Lam
 Richie Jen as Owen
 Shu Qi as JJ
 James Kim as Black Bear

Reception
David Cornelius of DVD Talk rated it 3.5/5 stars and called it a "breezy blend of action and comedy".  William Lee of DVD Verdict wrote, "Like a stir-fry of new ingredients combined with leftover ideas, Seoul Raiders is a big serving of entertaining, though forgettable, action-comedy."  Derek Elley of Variety compared it negatively to the first film and called it a hastily written sequel that capitalizes on the popularity of Korean culture. Beyond Hollywood called it "popcorn entertainment through and through".  Stina Chyn of Film Threat rated it 3/5 stars and called it disappointing except for Tony Leung Chiu-wai's performance.

References

External links
 
 
 Seoul Raiders at LoveHKFilm.com

2005 films
2000s action comedy-drama films
2005 martial arts films
Hong Kong action comedy-drama films
Hong Kong martial arts films
Martial arts comedy films
2000s spy films
Hong Kong sequel films
Media Asia films
2000s Cantonese-language films
2000s Mandarin-language films
2000s Korean-language films
Films directed by Jingle Ma
Films set in Seoul
Films shot in Seoul
2005 comedy films
2005 drama films
Counterfeit money in film
2005 multilingual films
Hong Kong multilingual films
2000s Hong Kong films